Erin B. Mee is an American theater director.

Early life and career
Born in 1963, the daughter of playwright Charles L. Mee, Mee grew up in New York City. She earned her bachelor's degree from Harvard University in 1985, and went on to earn an MA and a Ph.D. from New York University's Department of Performance Studies, where she worked with Richard Schechner. She currently teaches Dramatic Literature at New York University.

Her first job after graduating from college was as a literary intern at the American Repertory Theatre. She went on to serve as Des McAnuff’s assistant at the La Jolla Playhouse, and was resident director at the Guthrie Theater from 1989 to 1991, when Garland Wright was artistic director.

Directing career
In 1988, Mee directed the world premiere of Charles Mee's The Imperialists at the Club Cave Canem at HOME for Contemporary Theatre and Art, which received reviews from the Village Voice and The New York Times, and was picked up by Joseph Papp for a run at The Public Theatre. In 2000, Mee staged another production of The Imperialists at the Club Cave Canem at The Market Theatre in Cambridge, Massachusetts.

She directed two productions in Malayalam with Sopanam, located in Kerala, South India: Faust (1993) and Arambachekkan (1996), both by Kavalam Narayana Panikkar. She directed Kavalam Narayana Panikkar's play Ottayan at The Ontological at St. Mark's Theatre in 1992, and Girish Karnad's Hayavadana at The Ontological at St. Mark's Theatre in 1993.

In 2001, Mee staged the world premiere of First Love with Ruth Maleczech and Fred Neumann of Mabou Mines, at New York Theatre Workshop. She staged a second production in 2002 at The Magic Theatre in San Francisco with Joan Mankin and Robert Parnell.

In 2013, Mee founded This Is Not A Theatre Company. She wrote and directed Pool Play, A Serious Banquet, Readymade Cabaret, and Versailles 2015. Her interest in podplays has led to the creation of Ferry Play, a site-specific audio play for the Staten Island Ferry, a podplay for a café in Avignon LeOff, and a podplay for the New York City subway system.

The New York Times included Ferry Play in their list of top ten NY Fringe shows for 2015, and The Wall Street Journal noted that Ferry Play turns the Staten Island Ferry into an immersive theatre experience.

In Pool Play, audiences sat at the edge of the pool with their feet in the water for an exploration of America's relationship with the swimming pool that included synchronized swimming, an boatman, musical numbers, and a fish along with stories about segregated pools, and a meditation on pollution. Sarah Lucie of Show Business Weekly described it as being "well executed" and with a "strong ensemble." Theatre is Easy also reviewed the show.

Versailles 2015 is a site-specific play for a New York City apartment. The piece was reviewed by the New York Theatre Review, who said that the show was "over far too quickly."

Books
 'Theatre of Roots: Redirecting the Modern Indian Stage
 DramaContemporary: India (edited)
 Antigone on the Contemporary World Stage (co-edited with Helene Foley)
 Modern Asian Theatre and Performance (1900-2000) (co-edited with Kevin Wetmore and Siyuan Siu)

Further reading
 2015	“The Neuroscience of Spectatorship.” In Reti, Saperi, Linguaggi: Italian Journal of Cognitive Sciences.
 2015	“Charles Mee’s (Re)Making of Greek Drama,” In The Oxford Handbook of Greek Drama in the Americas. Bosher, MacIntosh, McConell, and Rankine, eds.
 2015	“Smartphone Plays: A New Theatrical Genre.” HowlRound. May. Smartphone Plays
 2015	“Immersive and Interactive Theatre: A Rasic Experience.” HowlRound. March. Immersive and Interactive Performance
 2015	“The Audience Is The Message.” TCG's Audience (Re)volution blog series curated by Caridad Svitch. July.
 2015	“Diverse Audiences for Smartphone Plays.” TCG's Audience (Re)volution blog series curated by Caridad Svitch. Free business profile for TCGCIRCLE.ORG provided by Network Solutions
 2015	“Speaking A Thought in the World II: Garland Wright on Richard III.” Co-Written with Sari Ketter. SDC. July.
 2015	“Speaking A Thought in the World I: Garland Wright on The Misanthrope.” Co-Written with Sari Ketter. SDC. April.
 2014	“Rasa Is/As/And Emotional Contagion” In Natyasastra: Aesthetics, Epistemology & Performance Practice, edited by Sreenath Nair. McFarland Press.
 2014	“Standing Man and the Impromptu Performance of Hope” TDR 58:3 (223). Fall.
 2013	“Hearing the ‘Music of the Hemispheres,’” a born-digital multimodal composition-article about “neuroperformance” for TDR 57:3, T219. Fall.
 2013	“Women Directors in India.” In International Women Stage Directors, edited by Anne Fliotsos and Wendy Vierow. 
 2012	“The Cultural Intifada: Palestinian Theatre in the West Bank.” TDR 56:3 (T215). Fall 2012.
 2010	“But is it Theatre? Colonial Culture‘s Impact on Theatrical History in India.” In Theatre History: Critical Questions, edited by Henry Bial and Scott Magelssen. University of Michigan Press. 
 2010	“Classics, Cultural Politics, and the Role of Antigone in Manipur, NE India.” In India, Greece, and Rome 1757-2007 edited by Edith Hall and Phiroze Vasunia. London: Institute of Classical Studies, University of London.
 2007	“Mahesh Dattani: Invisible Issues.” In Mahesh Dattani's Plays: Critical Perspectives, ed. Angelie Multani. New Delhi: Pencraft International.
 2005	“Hayavadana: Model of Complexity.”  In Girish Karnad's Plays: Performance and Critical Perspectives, ed. Tutun Mukherjee.  New Delhi: Pencraft International.
 2002	“Mee on Mee.”  TDR 48,3 (T175).

References

External links
The Intricacies of Kutiyattam," Lecture at The Asia Society, New York City

Living people
1963 births
American dramatists and playwrights
American theatre directors
Women theatre directors
American women writers
Harvard University alumni
New York University alumni
21st-century American women